Innes is a surname. 

Innes may also refer to:

Genealogy
 Clan Innes, clan
 Innes baronets, four baronetcies

Geography

Places
Australia
 Glen Innes Severn Council, a local government area in New South Wales.
Innes National Park, South Australia
Inneston, South Australia, a locality
 Innes Park, Queensland, a town

New Zealand

 Lake Innes, lake in the South Island

Elsewhere
 Innes Ward, city ward, Ottawa, Ontario, Canada
 Mount Innes-Taylor, Antarctica

In space
 Innes (crater), on the Moon
 1658 Innes, an asteroid

Other
 Innes Road, Ottawa, Ontario, Canada
 The John Innes Centre, Norwich, Norfolk, England

Other uses
 The Innes Book of Records, album by Neil Innes

See also

Glen Innes (disambiguation)
 Innis (disambiguation)
 Ennis (disambiguation)
 Ennes (disambiguation)
 Ines (disambiguation)
 Inne